The 2015 Indy Grand Prix of Alabama was the fourth race of the 2015 IndyCar Series season. The race was run on Sunday April 26, 2015 in Birmingham, Alabama, United States at Barber Motorsports Park, the sixth time the Indy Grand Prix of Alabama was run. It was won by Josef Newgarden for the CFH Racing team. Graham Rahal took second for Rahal Letterman Lanigan Racing and Scott Dixon who races for Chip Ganassi Racing came in third. The top finishing rookie in the race, as he was in all three previous rounds in this years series, Gabby Chaves who finished 16th in the race as he did in the previous round.

Report

Qualifying

Race results 

Notes
 Points include 1 point for leading at least 1 lap during a race, an additional 2 points for leading the most race laps, and 1 point for Pole Position.

For the second straight race there were no DNF's

Championship standings after the race

Drivers' Championship standings

 Note: Only the top five positions are included.

References

 Lap Report - Verizon IndyCar Series, April 26, 2015

Grand Prix of Alabama
Honda Indy Grand Prix of Alabama
Honda Indy Grand Prix of Alabama
Honda Indy Grand Prix of Alabama